The Riyadh Green project is a large landscape-improving project in the capital city of Saudi Arabia, Riyadh. It is a project with an estimated budget US$32 Million. This project is part of four major projects to devolve the city ordered by the Crown Prince Mohamed bin Salaman bin Abdualazi. It is one of many under the Saudi Vision 2030. The goal is to develop the city and be one of the top 100 cities in the world.

Vision
The project would help to increase the green space per capita in the city by planting different plants across the city. The recycling water system is going to be used. The greening program would result in better air quality and decreased town temperatures.

forestation
The project has a goal of planting 7.2 million trees in different places around the city using 72 local tree species that can handle the heat and wind in Riyadh. The trees will be placed in schools, car parking sites, government facilities, healthcare facilities, universities, parks, Mosques, and roads, streets, and green belts of a specific length.

Irrigation
The city uses about 90,000 cubic meters per day for irrigation and by the end of the project, it needs 1 million cubic meter per day. To achieve this a new sustainable irrigation system will be used.

See also
 King Salman Park, a park located in Riyadh as a part of the Riyadh Green project. It is estimated to be five times bigger than London's Hyde Park, London and four times than the New York's Central Park.

References

External links
 Riyadh Green website

Year of establishment missing
Economy of Riyadh
Geography of Riyadh
Proposed infrastructure in Saudi Arabia
Government programs